WFNU-LP is a community low-power broadcast radio station licensed to Saint Paul, Minnesota, serving Frogtown and much of Saint Paul on 94.1 MHz. The station has a hyper-local focus on the Frogtown community and surrounding neighborhoods. Programming is varied, with multiple genres of music to local talk with community members. WFNU-LP broadcasts from an antenna on top of the Frogtown Square building on the corner of University Avenue and Dale Street in Frogtown.

History
WFNU-LP is the second LPFM radio station in St. Paul (the first being WEQY-LP). The station launched on August 3, 2016 after the organization had been streaming programming online for over a year.

See also
List of community radio stations in the United States

References

External links
 
 

Low-power FM radio stations in Minnesota
Community radio stations in the United States
Radio stations established in 2016
Radio stations in Minnesota
2016 establishments in Minnesota